The Education (Scotland) Act 1872 (35 & 36 Vict. c. 62) made  elementary education for all children between the ages of 5 and 13 mandatory in Scotland.

The Act achieved a more thorough transfer of existing schools to a public system than the 1870 Education Act in England. It created popularly elected school boards which undertook a significant building programme. The Scottish Act remains controversial because it caused substantial harm to the Scottish Gaelic language. At the time it was criticised because it did not deal with secondary education and because it did too little to safeguard the tradition of the parish schools in Scotland.

Background
In 1866 the government established the Argyll Commission, under Whig grandee George Campbell, 8th Duke of Argyll, to look into the schooling system. It found that of 500,000 children in need of education 200,000 were receiving it under efficient conditions, 200,000 in schools of doubtful merit, without any inspection and 90,000 were receiving no education at all. Although this compared favourably with the situation in England, with 14% more children in education and with relatively low illiteracy rates of between 10 and 20%, similar to those in the best-educated nations such as those in Germany, the Netherlands, Switzerland and Scandinavia, the report was used as support for widespread reform. The result was the 1872 Education (Scotland) Act, based on that passed for England and Wales as the Elementary Education Act 1870, but providing a more comprehensive solution.

The Act
Under the act approximately 1,000 regional school boards were established and, unlike in England where they merely attempted to fill gaps in provision, immediately took over the schools of the old and new kirks and were able to begin to enforce attendance, rather than after the decade necessary in England. Some ragged and industrial schools requested to be taken over by the boards, while others continued as Sunday schools. All children aged from 5 to 13 years were to attend. Poverty was not accepted as an excuse and some help was supplied under the Poor laws. This was enforced by the School Attendance Committee, while the boards busied themselves with building to fill the gaps in provision. This resulted in a major programme that created large numbers of grand, purpose-built schools. Overall administration was in the hands of the Scotch (later Scottish) Education Department in London. Demand for places was high and for a generation after the act there was overcrowding in many classrooms, with up to 70 children being taught in one room. The emphasis on a set number of passes at exams also led to much learning by rote and the system of inspection led to even the weakest children being drilled with certain facts.

Effect on Gaelic
The Education (Scotland) Act 1872 effectively put an end to non-English medium education and repressed Scottish Gaelic medium education, with pupils being punished for speaking the language. Pupils were physically punished if caught speaking in Gaelic and beaten again if they did not reveal the names of other students speaking Gaelic. The effect of the education act upon the Gaelic language has been described as "disastrous" and by denying the value of Gaelic culture and language, contributed to destroying the self-respect of Gaelic communities. It was a continuation of a general policy (by both Scottish and, after 1707, British governments) which aimed at Anglicisation.

As a result of facing punishment and humiliation for speaking Gaelic, many parents decided not to pass on the language to their children, resulting in language shift. Scottish Gaelic medium education was not established until the 1980s, and the impact of the Act is still being felt in Gaelic communities today.

See also
 Canadian Gaelic § Reasons for decline
  in Occitan-speaking France
 Treachery of the Blue Books in Wales
 American Indian boarding schools
 Canadian Indian residential school system
 Specific devices for punishing children using the "wrong" language in schools:
 Welsh Not
  in France
 Dialect card in Japan

References

1872 in education
Education
History of education in Scotland
Language legislation
United Kingdom Education Acts
Scottish Gaelic education
Celtic medium education
United Kingdom Acts of Parliament 1872
Acts of the Parliament of the United Kingdom concerning Scotland